Bešeňová is a village and municipality in Ružomberok District in the Žilina Region of northern Slovakia. It is famous for a hot spring water park attracting thousands of visitors all year round.

History
In historical records the village was first mentioned in 1503.

Geography
The municipality lies at an altitude of 512 metres and covers an area of 4.297 km². It has a population of about 390 people.

References

External links
 https://web.archive.org/web/20050401233716/http://www.besenova.sk/
 Official site of the thermal park

Villages and municipalities in Ružomberok District